Concilium is a Latin word that means "a council, a meeting." It may also refer to:

 Concilium (journal), a worldwide journal of Catholic theology
 Concilium Germanicum (c. 742), the first major Church synod to be held in the eastern parts of the Frankish kingdoms
 Concilium Plebis, the principal popular assembly of the ancient Roman Republic
 Magnum Concilium (Great Council), an assembly established in the reign of the Normans
 Sacrosanctum Concilium (Constitution on the Sacred Liturgy), one of the constitutions of the Second Vatican Council

See also
Consilium (disambiguation)